Mousel is a beer founded in 1511 in Luxembourg.

Brief details
The old Mousel brewery is located in the capital Luxembourg City, along the banks of the river Alzette. Mousel brews only one beer. The brewery's former restaurant, Mousel's Cantine, serves local cuisine as well as the Clausel beers, they don't serve Mousel any more.

Beers
As well as the Mousel brand the brewery produces Diekirch brands .

Availability
Beers is only available in 50l Kegs, and the production will cease to exist. There is limited distribution in Europe.

Future
The former brewery site has been developed into a gastronomic center including up-to-date bars, restaurants and beer places. This area, called "Rives de Clausen", opened in 2008.

External links
RateBeer
Mousel

Breweries in Luxembourg
Brands of Luxembourg
Companies based in Luxembourg City
1747 establishments in Europe